Cavnic is a former mining town located in the valley of the river Cavnic,  east of Baia Mare, in Maramureș County, northern Romania.

History 

Cavnic was first documented in 1336, as Capnic. It was named after the river, which got its name from a Slavic word, kopanе, which refers to digging. Mining activity in the area dates back to the Roman age.

The town was destroyed by the Ottomans in 1460 and by the Tatars in 1717, but the Tatars invasion ended with their defeat from the people of Cavnic, making from it the last Tatar invasion to ever take place in the current territory of Romania. As a proof of the last Tatar invasion, the town hosts a 7.2 m tall obelisk on which a Latin inscription states "Anno 1717 usque hic fuerunt tartari" meaning "During the year 1717 the Tatars have arrived here". The obelisk is known among locals as "Tatar Pole" or "Written Rock". The exact date when the obelisk was built is currently unknown.

In the 1910 Census of the Kingdom of Hungary, Kapnikbánya (as it was then called) was in Szatmár county, Nagybánya district.  It then had a population of 3517, out of which 1864 were Hungarians, 49 were Germans and 1604 were Romanians. 1497 identified as Catholic, 1890 as Greek Catholic, and 89 as Jewish.

The town's mines tended to close and reopen, often not remaining operational for any great length of time. In the 1970s, however, Cavnic underwent a great deal of development. Two ski slopes were built at Icoana, and the town gained motels, boardinghouses and a hotel to take advantage of its touristic potential.

As an interesting detail of touristic interest, it appears that one of the oldest inscriptions ever found in European mines has been uncovered in Voievod Gallery belonging to the former town's mine. The inscription states "Hier hats erschlagen Iacob Huber" ("Here was killed Iacob Huber"). The text, dated 1511, was most likely written to commemorate a mining accident.

In 2011 it had 4,862 residents, of whom 4,026 were Romanians (82.8%), 705 Hungarians (14.5%), 28 Roma, 4 Germans and 97 others.

Famous people
 Ignaz von Born, geologist, was born here on December 26, 1742.
 Jenő Jendrassik, Hungarian professor and philosopher, was born here in 1824.
 Simon Papp, Hungarian geologist, was born here on February 14, 1886.

References

External links 

 Pictures and landscapes from the Carpathian Mountains
  www.cavnic.ro
  www.orasulcavnic.ro

Towns in Romania
Populated places in Maramureș County
Ski areas and resorts in Romania
Mining communities in Romania
Monotowns in Romania